Paule Andral (14 September 1879 – 28 March 1956) was a French actress.

Andral was born Paule Roucole in Paris and died in Nice in 1956.

Selected filmography
 Tarakanova (1930)
 David Golder (1931)
 The Rebel (1931)
 The Beautiful Adventure (1932)
 Imperial Violets (1932)
 The Star of Valencia (1933)
 The Little King (1933)
 The Ironmaster (1933)
 Judex (1934)
 Street Without a Name (1934)
 Dora Nelson (1935)
 Speak to Me of Love (1935)
 Nights of Fire (1937)

Bibliography
 Alexander, John. Catherine the Great: Life and Legend. Oxford University Press, 1989

External links

1879 births
1956 deaths
French film actresses
French silent film actresses
Actresses from Paris
20th-century French actresses